Bettencourt-Rivière is a commune in the Somme department in Hauts-de-France in northern France.

Geography
The commune is made up of two villages: Bettencourt to the west, on the left bank of the small river Airaines and Rivière to the east, on the right bank of the river.

Population

Places of interest
 Bettencourt church
 Rivière church

See also
Communes of the Somme department

References

Communes of Somme (department)
Somme communes articles needing translation from French Wikipedia